The 2019–20 season was Al-Hilal's 44th consecutive season in the top flight of Saudi football and 62nd year in existence as a football club. The club participated in the Pro League, the King Cup and both the 2019 and the 2020 editions of the AFC Champions League. Al-Hilal also competed in the FIFA Club World Cup following their triumph in the 2019 AFC Champions League Final. The season covers the period from 1 July 2019 to 29 November 2020. In this season, Al Hilal became the first asian club to complete a continental treble since Tokyo Verdy in 1987.

Players

Squad information

Out on loan

Transfers and loans

Transfers in

Loans in

Transfers out

Loans out

Pre-season

Competitions

Overall

Overview

Goalscorers

Clean sheets

Last Updated: 27 October 2020

References

Al Hilal SFC seasons
Hilal
Hilal